The United States men's national cycling team is the national cycling team for the United States of America and is governed by USA Cycling. The team takes part in international competitions such as the Summer Olympics, the Pan American Road and Track Championships, and the UCI Road World Championships.

Road cycling 
Road cycling is a team sport designed to determine individual placings.  Professional cyclists mainly compete against each other on industry/trade sponsored cycling teams; however, for international competitions riders from the same nation compete together versus against each other to form a cycling team and represent the United States.

Past results 
 1982 UCI Road World Championship - Road Race: Silver Medal - Greg LeMond
 1983 UCI Road World Championship - Road Race: Gold Medal - Greg LeMond
 1984 Summer Olympics - Men's Individual Road Race: Gold Medal - Alexi Grewal
 1984 Summer Olympics - Men's Team Time Trial: Bronze Medal - United States (Ron Kiefel, Clarence Knickman, Davis Phinney, Andrew Weaver)
 1985 UCI Road World Championship - Road Race: Silver Medal - Greg LeMond
 1989 UCI Road World Championship - Road Race: Gold Medal - Greg LeMond
 1993 UCI Road World Championship - Road Race: Gold Medal - Lance Armstrong
 2000 Summer Olympics - Men's Individual Time Trial: Bronze Medal - Lance Armstrong
 2004 Summer Olympics - Men's Individual Time Trial: Gold Medal - Tyler Hamilton
 2004 Summer Olympics - Men's Individual Time Trial: Bronze Medal - Bobby Julich
 2006 UCI Road World Championships - Individual Time Trial: Silver Medal - David Zabriskie

Track cycling

Past results 
 1984 Summer Olympics - Men's Individual Pursuit: Gold Medal - Steve Hegg
 1984 Summer Olympics - Men's Individual Pursuit: Bronze Medal - Leonard Nitz
 1984 Summer Olympics - Men's Individual Sprint: Gold Medal - Mark Gorski
 1984 Summer Olympics - Men's Individual Sprint: Silver Medal - Nelson Vails
 1984 Summer Olympics - Men's Team Pursuit: Bronze Medal - United States (David Grylls, Steve Hegg, Patrick McDonough, Leonard Nitz)
 1992 Summer Olympics - 1000m Time Trial: Bronze Medal - Erin Hartwell
 1994 UCI Track Cycling World Championships - Men's Sprint: Gold Medal - Marty Nothstein
 1994 UCI Track Cycling World Championships - Men's Keirin: Gold Medal - Marty Nothstein
 1996 UCI Track Cycling World Championships - Men's Keirin: Gold Medal - Marty Nothstein
 1996 Summer Olympics - Men's 1000m Time Trial: Silver Medal - Erin Hartwell
 1996 Summer Olympics - Men's Olympic Sprint: Silver Medal - Marty Nothstein
 2000 Summer Olympics - Men's Olympic Sprint: Gold Medal - Marty Nothstein
 2007 UCI Track Cycling World Championships - Men's Omnium: Bronze Medal Charles Bradley Huff

Cycling teams based in the United States
Cycling in the United States
National cycling teams
Men's cycling teams